Valerie Red-Horse (born 1959, in California) is an investment banker, business owner, filmmaker and philanthropist of Cherokee heritage.  She is a former CEO of two  Financial Industry Regulatory Authority (FINRA) broker/dealers, Native Nations Securities and Red-Horse Securities believed to be the first Native American female owned broker-dealers.

Education and career

Early years
In 1981, Red-Horse graduated cum laude from UCLA's Theater Arts Department and further studied at the Lee Strasberg Theater Institute.  Before she finished college, she started work at Drexel Burnham Lambert as office manager from 1978 to 1985 for John Kissick in the Corporate Finance Department. She is married to Curt Mohl, whom she met when she was a cheerleader and he was a UCLA football player. They have three children.

Red-Horse Native Productions
Later, Red-Horse became the founder, president, and principal owner of Red-Horse Native Productions, Inc., a company specializing in motion picture and television production and Native American herbal skincare and hair care products. Naturally Native (1998) was filmed by Red-Horse Native Productions, and Red-Horse was writer, producer, co-director and lead actress for the film. The movie was funded by the Mashantucket Pequot Tribal Nation of Connecticut with financing from its Foxwoods Casino and premiered at the 1998 Sundance Film Festival.  Naturally Native received multiple festival awards and in 2007 Red-Horse Native Productions nationally distributed the film in Wal-Mart. Red-Horse followed with the World War II PBS/ITVS award winning documentary “TRUE WHISPERS: THE STORY OF THE NAVAJO CODE TALKERS”, produced with Gale Anne Hurd of Valhalla Entertainment. Red-Horse also produced/directed the “prequel” follow up program, again with Hurd, CHOCTAW CODE TALKERS regarding the Code Talkers’ involvement in World War I (Vision Maker Media/PBS).  Over her career Red-Horse has produced/directed multiple Native American themed programs for public television including DIVERSITY IN THE DELTA, POP HUNTER’S DEW DROP INN, WINDOWS ON MARS, LIVING VOICES and a 2012 cutting edge Native American cooking show featuring master chef Loretta Oden for FNX/PBS.  As a writer Red-Horse penned the Emmy award winning MY INDIAN SUMMER (CBS) and AFI’s LOOKS INTO THE NIGHT in which she also starred as lead actress. Red-Horse is currently producing/directing (again in collaboration with Hurd for Vision Maker Media/PBS) the biographical documentary of Wilma Mankiller who served as the first female elected Principal Chief of the Cherokee Nation.  Red-Horse recently served as a co-curator for a comprehensive 100 year Native American film retrospective and national tour sponsored by the UCLA Film and Archive which toured the nation during 2014-2016.

Native Nations and Red-Horse Financial Group
In 1998 Red-Horse started a FINRA licensed securities Jersey City, New Jersey-based firm, Native Nations Securities, believed to be the first Native American owned investment banks. The firm provided financial services geared specifically to tribal finance, tribal economic development, and youth training programs. In 1999, in a desire to expand, Native Nations Securities identified for possible
acquisition, a 96 year old New Jersey bond firm, Freeman Securities. In 2001 after nearly two years of due diligence, Ms. Red-Horse learned that a long-time employee of Freeman Securities had engaged in a series of fraudulent stock loan transactions prior to the acquisition, which were hidden on Freeman’s books and had been undisclosed to Red-Horse and the NASD auditors. Ms. Red-Horse and the other original directors of Native Nations Securities immediately reported these transactions to the U.S. Attorneys’ Office, the Securities and Exchange Commission and NASD (now FINRA).  With NASD approval, Red-Horse reversed the purchase agreement of Freeman Securities, then already known as Native Nations Securities. The purchase was reversed but some press continued to incorrectly associate Ms. Red-Horse with the subsequent SIPC payout and bankruptcy simply due to the premature name change from Freeman Securities.  Red-Horse was never the target of any investigation relating to this matter.

In 2004 Ms. Red-Horse moved her office to California and formed her own advisory corporation, Red-Horse Financial Group, Inc. clearing securities through Western International Securities.  Since 2004 Red-Horse Financial Group, with Ms. Red-Horse at the helm, has closed several financing and advisory transactions for tribal clients establishing Red-Horse as a leading expert in the tribal finance space. In the course of her financial career, Red-Horse has structured, advised for and/or raised over $3 billion in capital for American Indian Tribal Nations.

Philanthropy
Red-Horse is the founder of both H.A.P.N. (the Hollywood Access Program for Natives) a non-profit training organization providing on the job mentorship to Native Americans in the film and television industry and “Jesusize” a dance/exercise ministry serving urban women in rehabilitation residence at the Anne Douglas Center in downtown Los Angeles.  In 2006, she and her family witnessed the severe living conditions of certain tribal members (mostly elders and children) located on a remote reservation in Northern Minnesota where unemployment exceeds 60%, the winter temperatures are extremely harsh and there is a general lack of basic services.  As a response, Red-Horse and her family founded the White Earth Cass Lake Annual Short Term Mission Trip whereby mission teams repair and weatherproof trailers and homes, lead activities for the community children, host a family evening event and distribute elder gift bags every summer.

Notes

External links
 Official Valerie Red-Horse website 

1959 births
20th-century American actresses
21st-century American actresses
Living people
Actresses from California
American screenwriters
American television actresses
American women screenwriters
Businesspeople from California
American chief executives of financial services companies
UCLA Film School alumni
Pyramid and Ponzi schemes
American people of Cherokee descent
American women chief executives
20th-century American businesspeople
21st-century American businesspeople
20th-century American businesswomen
21st-century American businesswomen
Native American screenwriters
21st-century Native American women
21st-century Native Americans